Huntingtower may refer to:

Huntingtower, a part of the village of Huntingtower and Ruthvenfield, near Perth, Scotland
Huntingtower Castle, near the village of Huntingtower, Scotland
Huntingtower (novel), a 1922 novel by John Buchan
Huntingtower (film), a 1927 British film based on the novel
Huntingtower School, Melbourne, Australia
Huntingtower: Ballad for Band, a musical composition by Ottorino Respighi